Bishopsbarns is a historic house in south-west York, in England.

The house lies on St George's Place, near the Knavesmire.  It was designed by the architect Walter Brierley as his own house, and was completed in 1905.  Brierley commissioned George Percy Bankart to design the house's plasterwork, and Gertrude Jekyll to design the garden.  Clive Aslet described the building as showing Brierley "at his best", with "great care... taken over the craftmanship".  Brierley took the house's name from the fact that the site had previously been occupied by barns belonging to the See of York.

The house is in the Tudor revival style, inspired by the Arts and Crafts movement.  It is of two storeys, and is built of handmade bricks, which are only two inches thick.  The roofs are covered in handmade tile, and incorporate dormer windows, bringing light into the attics.  The woodwork is all of oak.  There are wings at the left and right sides of the building, each in a similar style.  The majority of the windows have mullions and transoms, and some have small panes in a diamond lattice.  The back of the house has a single storey, with a loggia.

Inside, the house retains its original decoration.  The entrance hall is covered in Delft tiles, collected by Brierley, while the other halls are panelled.  The dining room has its original wallpaper, and both dining and drawing rooms have decorative plastered ceilings, and stone fireplaces.  The ceiling in the drawing room is barrel vaulted, and is modelled on one in Pinkie House in Musselburgh.  The original light fittings also survive, on the ground floor.

The garden is enclosed by a brick wall.  Lawrence Weaver stated that "there can be nothing but praise, for though it is small the best use has been made of the available space", and praised Jekyll's planting, providing interest throughout the year, and use of yew hedging.  There is a forecourt, which is cobbled with stones taken from the beach at Flamborough.  The garden was restored in the early 2010s.

The house was Grade II* listed in 1983.  In 2015, the house was placed on the market for £2.4 million.  The Press later reported that it was the first house in the city to sell for more than £2 million.

References

Arts and Crafts architecture in England
Buildings and structures completed in 1905
Grade II* listed buildings in York
Houses in North Yorkshire